16-Ketoestradiol (16-keto-E2, 16-oxoestradiol, or 16-oxo-E2) is an endogenous estrogen related to 16-ketoestrone. 16-Ketoestrone is a very weak estrogen with only 1/1000 the estrogenic potency of estradiol in the uterus. It is a so-called "short-acting" or "impeded" estrogen, similarly to estriol and dimethylstilbestrol.

See also
 16-Ketoestrone

References

Secondary alcohols
Estranes
Estrogens
Human metabolites
Phenols